The East Shore Seawall, also known as Staten Island Multi-Use Elevated Promenade, is a  long combined seawall and esplanade proposed for the eastern shoreline of Staten Island, New York. It would run along the Lower New York Bay linking sections of the Gateway National Recreation Area: Fort Wadsworth at the north, Miller Field, and Great Kills Park to the south. It will roughly parallel Father Capodanno Boulevard and the South Beach–Franklin Delano Roosevelt Boardwalk.

The coastal engineering strategy is to address climate change and sea level rise, and improve resilience along the shoreline of the New York–New Jersey Harbor Estuary and Port of New York and New Jersey. It will  also function as a linear park/greenway with recreational amenities including a boardwalk, biking and walking paths, and will provide access to public beaches.

The project, a collaboration between the US Army Corps of Engineers and the  - New York New York State Department of Environmental Conservation, was first announced in May 2017. In 2019, the city allocated $615 million for its design and construction.

Conflicts over environmental remediation has stalled the building of the project, originally projected to be completed in 2024.

See also
Billion Oyster Project
Freshkills Park
Vision 2020: New York City Comprehensive Waterfront Plan
Sea Bright–Monmouth Beach Seawall
New York Harbor Storm-Surge Barrier

References

External links
 Summary Report, Resilient Neighborhoods, East Shore Staten Island, April 2017
 Shoreline Parks Plan A Plan for the East Shore of Staten Island

Seawalls
Redeveloped ports and waterfronts in the United States
Buildings and structures in Staten Island
Protected areas of Staten Island
Port of New York and New Jersey
Gateway National Recreation Area